Kewaskum is a village in Washington and Fond du Lac counties in Wisconsin, United States. The population was 4,004 at the 2010 census. All of this population resided in the Washington County portion of the village. The village is mostly surrounded by the Town of Kewaskum.

Toponymy
Kewaskum was the leader of a group of Potawatomi Native Americans who lived in Washington County in the 1840s. He was friendly with the early settlers, including future Wisconsin state senator Densmore Maxon. He died sometime between 1847 and 1850. In 1849, the early settlers named the Town of Kewaskum (and later the village) in his honor. In the Potawatomi language, Kewaskum means "turning back on his tracks" or "retracing his steps."

History
In the early 19th century, the Kewaskum area was home to Potawatomi Native Americans, who surrendered the land the United States Federal Government in the 1833 Treaty of Chicago, which required them to leave Wisconsin by 1838. While many Potawatomis moved west of the Mississippi River to Kansas, some chose to remain, and were referred to as "strolling Potawatomi" in contemporary documents because many of them were migrants who subsisted by squatting on their ancestral lands, which were now owned by white settlers. One band of strolling Potawatomi travelled through Dodge, Jefferson, and Washington counties, and was led by Chief Kewaskum, who had a camp on Pike Lake. The chief was friendly with the white settlers who began arriving in the 1840s. He died sometime between 1847 and 1850, but itinerant Potawatomis lived in Washington County into the late 19th century, when many of them gathered in northern Wisconsin to form the Forest County Potawatomi Community.

The first settlers in the area were the Barnes family, who arrived in 1844 and began farming near the future village. In 1847, the Wisconsin Territorial Legislature created the Town of North Bend from land that had previously been part of the Town of West Bend, and the community's first post office was established. In 1849, the residents changed their community's name to the "Town of Kewaskum" to distinguish it from neighboring West Bend.

While the first settlers were primarily farmers, the village of Kewaskum traces its origins to J. H. Myer, who settled on a horseshoe bend in the Milwaukee River in 1852 and later built a sawmill and a gristmill. The settlement, which was originally known as "Myer's Mill" and later as "Kewaskum Center," soon became a market town with a general store and a blacksmith shop serving the local farmers. The first religious services were held in private homes, and in 1862 the Catholic villagers constructed a church. A German Methodist church was built in 1866 and a Lutheran church was built in 1868. In 1873, the Chicago and North Western Railway completed a line from Milwaukee to Fond du Lac with a station in Kewaskum. The community's rail connections caused the local economy to grow and prosper as new businesses, including hotels, stores, and grain elevators opened around the station. The Village of Kewaskum incorporated in 1895.

While the village economy was primarily agricultural in the 19th and early 20th centuries, Kewaskum became increasingly industrialized throughout the 1900s. In 1919, Adolph J. Rosenheimer founded the Kewaskum Aluminum Company in the village to manufacture aluminum cookware. During World War II, the company made aluminum products for military use, before being acquired by Enterprise Aluminum Company of Ohio in 1945. The company was renamed Regal Ware in 1951, and through acquisitions of aluminum companies in Wisconsin, Illinois, Ohio, and Mississippi, moved into the international high-end consumer cookware market.
The community's population grew during the post–World War II economic expansion, leading the village to annex land from the Town of Kewaskum for new commercial and residential developments. The village first annexed land in 1959 and again in twenty of the next forty-six years. Additionally, Kewaskum annexed a noncontiguous parcel of land in the Town of Auburn in Fond du Lac County in 1963.

Geography
The primary north–south highway serving Kewaskum is U.S. Route 45, and the primary east–west highway is Wisconsin Highway 28. Kewaskum is located in the 262 Area Code of south-eastern Wisconsin, with Prefix 626.

Demographics

2010 census
As of the census of 2010, there were 4,004 people, 1,581 households, and 1,148 families living in the village. The racial makeup of the village was 96.0% White, 0.5% African American, 0.3% Native American, 0.5% Asian, 1.2% from other races, and 1.3% from two or more races. Hispanic or Latino of any race were 2.9% of the population.

There were 1,581 households, of which 35.3% had children under the age of 18 living with them, 57.9% were married couples living together, 10.0% had a female householder with no husband present, 4.7% had a male householder with no wife present, and 27.4% were non-families. 21.6% of all households were made up of individuals, and 8.3% had someone living alone who was 65 years of age or older. The average household size was 2.52 and the average family size was 2.92.

The median age in the village was 36.8 years. 25.4% of residents were under the age of 18; 7.1% were between the ages of 18 and 24; 29.7% were from 25 to 44; 24.9% were from 45 to 64; and 12.7% were 65 years of age or older. The gender makeup of the village was 49.0% male and 51.0% female.

2000 census
As of the census of 2000, there were 3,274 people, 1,212 households, and 895 families living in the village. The population density was 2,217.3 people per square mile (854.1/km2). There were 1,264 housing units at an average density of 856.0 per square mile (329.8/km2). The racial makeup of the village was 97.95% White, 0.27% Black or African American, 0.18% Native American, 0.37% Asian, 0.37% from other races, and 0.86% from two or more races. 0.92% of the population were Hispanic or Latino of any race.

There were 1,212 households, out of which 37.8% had children under the age of 18 living with them, 59.8% were married couples living together, 10.0% had a female householder with no husband present, and 26.1% were non-families. 21.1% of all households were made up of individuals, and 7.1% had someone living alone who was 65 years of age or older. The average household size was 2.64 and the average family size was 3.09.

In the village, the population was spread out, with 27.4% under the age of 18, 9.3% from 18 to 24, 31.7% from 25 to 44, 19.5% from 45 to 64, and 12.0% who were 65 years of age or older. The median age was 33 years. For every 100 females, there were 97.3 males. For every 100 females age 18 and over, there were 94.8 males.

The median income for a household in the village was $49,861, and the median income for a family was $55,144. Males had a median income of $37,639 versus $25,806 for females. The per capita income for the village was $20,509. About 4.0% of families and 5.0% of the population were below the poverty line, including 4.0% of those under age 18 and 8.7% of those age 65 or over.

Notable people
 Ty Bodden, Wisconsin State Representative, previously lived in Kewaskum.
 Louis D. Guth, Wisconsin State Representative and businessman, lived in Kewaskum.
 Kenneth William Haebig, Wisconsin State Representative and lawyer, lived in Kewaskum.
 Einar H. Ingman Jr., Medal of Honor recipient, lived in Kewaskum.
 Jesse Kremer, Wisconsin State Representative, lived in Kewaskum
 Timothy Ramthun, Wisconsin State Representative, lived in Kewaskum.
 Jordan Stolz, American world champion speedskater, lives in the village.
 Glenway Wescott, noted American author, was born in Kewaskum in 1901. He lived abroad, wrote poetry, novels, and criticism, returned to the United States, and died in 1987.

See also
 List of villages in Wisconsin

References

External links

 
 Sanborn fire insurance maps: 1894 1900 1910

Villages in Washington County, Wisconsin
Villages in Fond du Lac County, Wisconsin
Villages in Wisconsin